The third USS Pilgrim (SP-1204) was a United States Navy patrol vessel in commission from 1917 to 1919.

Construction and early career
Pilgrim was built as a private, steel-hulled sailing yacht of the same name in 1893 by Pusey and Jones at Wilmington, Delaware, for a racing syndicate in Boston, Massachusetts, which intended to use her in competition for America's Cup; she had  of sail. During a series of races off Sandy Hook, New Jersey, against three other yachts in September 1893, she proved to be fast but too poor at minding her helm to race competitively, and another yacht was selected to represent the United States in defense of Americas Cup.  In 1894, the syndicate sold her to Lamont G. Burnham, Esq., of Boston, who had her converted to steam propulsion; she served as his private yacht.

By 1907, Pilgrim was the property of the Boston Floating Hospital. In 1908 and 1909, she served as the private yacht of Wendell H. Wyman of Boston; in 1910 and 1911, she operated as a fishing vessel, with her home port at Boston. In 1913, she was sold to Hugh C. Jones of Beaufort, North Carolina; converted to gasoline engine propulsion that year, she operated as a fishing vessel. The Beaufort Fish Scrap and Oil Company of New Bern, North Carolina, purchased her in 1916.

United States Navy service
On 30 June 1917 or in July 1917, the U.S. Navy acquired her under a free lease from Beaufort Fish Scrap and Oil for use as a section patrol boat during World War I. She was commissioned on 18 July 1917 as USS Pilgrim (SP-1204).

Assigned to the 5th Naval District, Pilgrim patrolled the North Carolina coast for the rest of World War I, operating in Pamlico Sound and Onslow Bay as far south as the New River.

Pilgrim was decommissioned on 7 January 1919, and returned to Beaufort Fish Oil and Scrap the same day.

Later career

Beaufort Fish Scrap and Oil operated Pilgrim until 1927, when she was sold to the Newport Fisheries Company of Beaufort. F. S. Dickinson of Rutherford, New Jersey, purchased her in 1934, but her home port remained Beaufort. At times during the 1920s and 1930s, Pilgrim operated out of Mayport, Florida, while fishing.

Abandoned in 1935, Pilgrim was towed to Harkers Point at Harkers Island, North Carolina, for use as a breakwater. Her hull was filled with concrete to keep her from moving.

The remains of Pilgrims hull remain visible at Harkers Point.

Notes

References

Department of the Navy Naval History and Heritage Command Online Library of Selected Images: U.S. Navy Ships: USS Pilgrim (SP-1204), 1917-1919
NavSource Online: Section Patrol Craft Photo Archive Pilgrim (SP 1204)

Patrol vessels of the United States Navy
World War I patrol vessels of the United States
Ships built by Pusey and Jones
1893 ships
Shipwrecks of the Carolina coast
Ships sunk as breakwaters